Globignatha is a genus of dwarf orb-weavers that was first described by J. Balogh & I. Loksa in 1968.  it contains two species, found in Belize and Brazil: G. rohri and G. sedgwicki.

See also
 List of Symphytognathidae species

References

Araneomorphae genera
Spiders of Brazil
Spiders of Central America
Symphytognathidae